Malcolm Taylor (born June 20, 1960) is a former professional American football defensive end in the National Football League. He played six seasons for the Houston Oilers (1982–1986), the Los Angeles Raiders (1987–1988), and the Atlanta Falcons (1989).

References

1960 births
Living people
People from Crystal Springs, Mississippi
Players of American football from Mississippi
American football defensive ends
Tennessee State Tigers football players
Houston Oilers players
Los Angeles Raiders players
Atlanta Falcons players